Sir James Hobart, also known as James Hoberd and James Hubbard, (1436 – 24 February 1517) of Norfolk became a member of Lincoln's Inn during Edward IV of England's reign and was appointed attorney-general and knighted during the reign of Henry VII.

Career
Hobart became a member of Lincoln's Inn during Edward IV's reign. He performed some legal services for John Mowbray, duke of Norfolk and is likely the James Hoberd who went to parliament in 1467 and 1478, representing Ipswich. Hobart was elected Lent reader at his inn in 1479.

Henry VII appointed him attorney-general on 1 November 1486. He then became a member of the privy council. Hobart was one of the men appointed to seize Calais for Henry VII and take possessions of the king and other townspeople.

Hobart assumed several responsibilities in 1487. He was made commissioner of array for Norfolk in April. Hobart, and others, were appointed to oversee the fisheries on the east coast. He also supervised the repair of the harbour in Yarmouth. He served on two commissions in 1489. One for gaol delivery for Ipswich and Norwich and the other for peace and oyer and terminer for Suffolk. Hobart was appointed to try a suit at York, when he is styled serjeant, in August 1501. He was knighted on 18 February 1502–3 by Henry, prince of Wales.

Hobart left the attorney general office in 1507 following a controversy involving writs of praemunire facias.

Personal life
James was the youngest son of Thomas Hobart of Leyham in Norfolk. Hobart married three times. John Lyhert's sister, Margery, was his first wife. The second was Dorothy Glemham. Margery or Margaret Naunton, the daughter of Peter Naunton of Letheringham, Suffolk and the relict of John Doreward, Esq. (d.1495) was his third wife. She died in 1517. His daughter Catherine (by which wife is not known) married Thomas Curzon (d. after 1610) of Beck Hall Manor in Norfolk.

Hobart lived at his home, Hales Hall in Norfolk. He was a good friend of John Paston and is often mentioned in the Paston Letters.

Hobart's chest-tomb is located in the nave of the Norwich Cathedral. His great-grandson was Sir Henry Hobart, the chief justice.

Holy Trinity Church
Hobart erected "at his sole expense" the Holy Trinity Church at Loddon in 1490. A stained glass artwork, removed from the east window of the church and preserved as a painting, shows Hobart and Lady Margaret Hobart in prayer. A caption in Latin beneath them reads, Orate pro aia Jaci Hobart, milit. & attornati dmi regis, qui Hanc ecclesiam a primis fundamentis condidit in tribus annis cum suis propriis bonis, anno regis Henrici septimit undecimo. Roughly, it translates as "Pray for James Hobart, soldier and attorney general to the King, who contributed to the foundations of the Church in the eleventh year of King Henry VII."

Notes

References

1436 births

16th-century deaths

Year of death uncertain
Members of Lincoln's Inn

Attorneys General for England and Wales
Hobart family
15th-century English lawyers
16th-century English lawyers

People from Loddon